Raimundas is a Lithuanian masculine given name. It is a cognate of the name Raymond, and may refer to:

 Raimundas Čivilis (1959–2000),  Lithuanian basketball player
 Raimundas Labuckas (born 1984), Lithuanian sprint canoer 
 Raimundas Mažuolis (born  1972),  former freestyle swimmer from Lithuania
 Raimundas Palaitis, (born 1957), Lithuanian politician
 Raimundas Udrakis (born 1965), Lithuanian-Soviet Olympic equestrian

Masculine given names
Lithuanian masculine given names